Selbitz is a town in the district of Hof, in Bavaria, Germany. It is situated 12 km west of Hof.

Sport
The town's association football club SpVgg Selbitz greatest success came in 2012 when it qualified for the new northern division of the expanded Bayernliga, the fifth tier of the German football league system, where it played for two seasons until 2014.

References

Hof (district)